Arturo Casado Alda (born 26 January 1983 in Madrid) is a Spanish middle distance runner.

Achievements

Personal bests
800 metres - 1:44.74 - Rieti (ITA) 29.08.2010
1500 metres - 3:32.70 - Berlin (GER) 22.08.2010
Mile - 3:52.38 - Oslo (NOR) 15.06.2007

External links

1983 births
Living people
Spanish male middle-distance runners
Athletes (track and field) at the 2008 Summer Olympics
Olympic athletes of Spain
Athletes from Madrid
European Athletics Championships medalists
Mediterranean Games gold medalists for Spain
Mediterranean Games medalists in athletics
Athletes (track and field) at the 2005 Mediterranean Games
21st-century Spanish people